The Criminal Hypnotist is a 1909 American silent short drama film directed by D. W. Griffith.

Cast
 Owen Moore as The Man
 Marion Leonard as The Man's Fiancee
 Arthur V. Johnson as The Criminal Hypnotist
 David Miles as The Robbery Victim / Party Guest
 Charles Inslee as The Professor / Party Guest
 George Gebhardt as The Professor's Assistant / A Policeman / Party Guest
 Harry Solter as The Doctor
 Florence Lawrence as The Maid
 Linda Arvidson as Party Guest
 Anita Hendrie as Party Guest
 Jeanie MacPherson as Party Guest
 Tom Moore as Party Guest (unconfirmed)
 Herbert Yost (also credited Barry O'Moore) as Party Guest 
 Mack Sennett as Party Guest

References

External links
 

1909 films
1909 drama films
Silent American drama films
American silent short films
American black-and-white films
Biograph Company films
Films directed by D. W. Griffith
1909 short films
1900s American films